Kimberly Hyacinthe (born 28 March 1989) is a Canadian athlete specializing in the sprinting events. She competed in the 200 meters at the 2011 World Championships in Athletics without advancing to the semifinals.

Hyacinthe was born in Terrebonne, Quebec. In 2013, she won gold medal in the 200 meters at the 2013 Summer Universiade.

In July 2016 she was officially named to Canada's Olympic team.

Competition record

Personal bests
Outdoor
100 metres – 11.31 (+1.6) (Edmonton 2015)
200 metres – 22.78 (+1.6) (Kazan 2013)
400 metres – 55.71 (Montreal 2009)
Indoor
60 metres – 7.29 (Montréal 2014)
200 metres – 23.79 (New York 2011)

References

External links
 
 
 
 

1989 births
Living people
Canadian female sprinters
Black Canadian female track and field athletes
Haitian Quebecers
Canadian sportspeople of Haitian descent
People from Terrebonne, Quebec
Sportspeople from Quebec
Commonwealth Games competitors for Canada
Athletes (track and field) at the 2014 Commonwealth Games
Athletes (track and field) at the 2015 Pan American Games
Pan American Games bronze medalists for Canada
Pan American Games medalists in athletics (track and field)
World Athletics Championships athletes for Canada
Athletes (track and field) at the 2016 Summer Olympics
Olympic track and field athletes of Canada
Universiade medalists in athletics (track and field)
Universiade gold medalists for Canada
Canadian Track and Field Championships winners
Medalists at the 2009 Summer Universiade
Medalists at the 2013 Summer Universiade
Medalists at the 2015 Pan American Games